Ian Malcolm Livingstone (born 22 May 1962) is a British billionaire property developer, through the privately held London & Regional Properties, owned jointly with his brother Richard Livingstone.

Early life
Livingstone was born in the UK, the son of a dentist in Ealing, London. He was educated at St Paul's School, a leading private school. He attended City University London, where he received a bachelor's degree in Optometry and qualified as an optometrist in 1984.

Career
Livingstone served as the chairman and majority shareholder of the Optika Clulow Group, a retail chain which owned 170 optician stores, including David Clulow, Sunglass Hut, Harrods and Selfridges opticians, from 1990 to 2010. Another major shareholder was his brother Richard Livingstone, a surveyor. The brothers sold the retail chain in 2011 and are now primarily property developers.

Many of their early developments were financed by Jacob Rothschild's merchant bank Dawnay Day, who Ian said "proved very supportive".

Livingstone is the owner of Brightark, an investment vehicle. In 2005, in partnership with Claudio Del Vecchio, the President of the Retail Brand Alliance, he agreed to open Brooks Brothers stores in the United Kingdom. By 2006, they had opened one on Old Broad Street and another one on Regent Street, with plans to open a dozen more.

He has served as the co-Executive Chairman of London & Regional Properties with his brother since 1993. Through this holding company, they own David Lloyd Leisure and the leasehold for Cliveden House in Berkshire, and Hilton Hotels in London's Green Park and Park Lane. They redeveloped Marks & Spencer's former headquarters at 55 Baker Street, which now houses the offices of Knight Frank, the accountant BDO Stoy Hayward, and London & Regional itself.

In 2012, it was reported that the Livingstone brothers were submitting plans for a £600 million project by London's Waterloo station, that would involve the demolition of the 1960s office block, Elizabeth House, and replacing it with two towers, one of 29 storeys and the other of 10 storeys. The previous plan for three towers had been approved by London mayor Boris Johnson but rejected by the British government in 2009.

, together with Jaime Gilinski Bacal, they are developing the $700 million Panama Pacifico project in Panama City, Panama on the former Howard Air Force Base. He also serves on the Board of Trustees of The Mayor's Fund for London. In the 2014 Sunday Times Rich List, together with his brother Richard, they have an estimated net worth of £2.6 billion.

Personal life
He is married to Natalie, a Cambridge-educated journalist who works for magazines such as Tatler and OK!. In 2015 Natalie published The Mistresses of Cliveden, a history of some of the female occupants of Cliveden. They have three daughters, Grace and Alice, and Elizabeth. In 2011, they paid an estimated £20 million for a house in Notting Hill previously owned by the PR executive Matthew Freud and his wife, Elisabeth Murdoch, daughter of Rupert Murdoch. Livingstone is Jewish.

The Evening Standard notes that Livingstone and his brother are eager to avoid publicity and seek to lead a normal life for the sake of their children, and calls them "arguably the lowest-profile billionaire siblings in London" and "these most secretive of brothers".

References

1962 births
Living people
Businesspeople from London
British real estate businesspeople
People educated at St Paul's School, London
Alumni of City, University of London
British billionaires
People from Ealing
British Jews